Aloha Surf Hotel is a 2020 American independent film written and directed by Stefan Schaefer, and produced by Cicala Filmworks and Jonathan Stern's Abominable Pictures. The film premiered at the 2020 Hawaii International Film Festival, and was released to theatres in Hawaii on December 4, 2020.

Plot
The film centers on an ex surf pro who is forced to take a job at a beachfront hotel teaching obnoxious tourists how to surf. Soon he's the tennis pro, the yoga instructor, the handyman—he might even be key to saving this family-run, Hawaiian-owned hotel.

Cast
 Augie Tulba as Tai
 Taiana Tully as Kaila
 Branscombe Richmond as Mr. Kahele 
 Daniella Monet as Babymooner
 Alex Farnham as Shiv
 Shawn Mokuhahi Garnett as Moe
 Kealani Warner as Alana
 Matt Corboy as Doug
 Cyris Laury-Schaefer as Ethan
 Talei Laury-Schaefer as Maya
 Kai Lenny as himself

Release and reception
The film premiered at the 2020 Hawaii International Film Festival, where it was nominated for Best Made In Hawaii Feature Film. 

It opened theatrically in Hawai'i in December 2020, and played in Regal, Consolidated and several independent theaters in Hawai'i through June, 2021 — outperforming many studio films. 

It was nominated as 2021 "Best Hawaiian Film" by the Hawai'i Film Critics Society.

References

External links 
 

2020 films
2020 independent films